Tim Erfen (born 22 October 1982) is a German former professional footballer who played as a midfielder.

Career
Erfen was born in Mönchengladbach. He made his professional debut for Wuppertaler SV Borussia during the sixth round of fixtures of the 2008–09 3. Liga season in a 4–2 home loss to Wacker Burghausen.

Until 2012, he played for SSV Jahn Regensburg in the 2. Bundesliga.

References

External links 
 

1982 births
Living people
Sportspeople from Mönchengladbach
German footballers
Footballers from North Rhine-Westphalia
Association football midfielders
2. Bundesliga players
3. Liga players
Borussia Mönchengladbach players
VfL Bochum II players
FC Carl Zeiss Jena players
Rot Weiss Ahlen players
Rot-Weiss Essen players
Wuppertaler SV players
SSV Jahn Regensburg players